Keith Sterling (born Keith Sterling-McLeod, January 1952, Kingston, Jamaica) is a piano and keyboard player.

Biography

Keith Sterling is a well-respected Jamaican session musician, having played in various session/backing bands including The Upsetters, The Aggrovators, Soul Syndicate, The Boris Gardiner Happening, Word, Sound and Power, Lloyd Parks' We The People Band, and Sly and Robbie's Taxi Gang.  He is currently a member of The Wailers Band.

His older brothers Lester and Roy are also musicians, Lester having played saxophone with The Skatalites and Roy trumpet with Lynn Taitt and the Jets.

References

External links
 Listing of playing credits at Roots Archives

1952 births
Living people
Musicians from Kingston, Jamaica
Jamaican session musicians
Jamaican male musicians
Jamaican reggae musicians
Jamaican pianists
The Wailers members